KPDX (channel 49) is a television station licensed to Vancouver, Washington, United States, serving the Portland, Oregon area as an affiliate of MyNetworkTV. It is the only major commercial station in Portland that is licensed to the Washington side of the market.

KPDX is owned by Gray Television alongside Fox affiliate KPTV (channel 12). Both stations share studios on NW Greenbrier Parkway in Beaverton, while KPDX's transmitter is located in the Sylvan-Highlands section of Portland. KPDX's signal is relayed in Central Oregon through translator station KUBN-LD (channel 9) in Bend, making the station available in about two-thirds of the state.

Since February 2018, KPDX has been branded as Fox 12 Plus, an extension of the branding used by KPTV.

History

As an independent station
In August 1980, the local KLRK Broadcasting Corporation filed an application to construct a new TV station on channel 49 at Vancouver. The construction permit was granted by the Federal Communications Commission (FCC) on January 5, 1981, and took the KLRK call letters, representing Clark County. KLRK foresaw an independent station emphasizing Southwest Washington sports and news. However, work came to a halt when KLRK ran out of money to build the facility. In late 1981, Camellia City Telecasters, the owner of KTXL-TV in Sacramento, California, filed to buy the construction permit, an action decried by newly built KECH-TV (channel 22 in Salem) and Cascade Video, applicant for a station on channel 40. Camellia's entry in the Portland market was significant because it bought rights to $10 million of films and syndicated programs, which particularly harmed KECH.

Channel 49 would miss several planned launch dates due to multiple factors. The station was forced by Multnomah County to allow other interested broadcasters to rent tower space, and Oregon Public Broadcasting's KOAP-TV and KOPB-FM used the opportunity to consolidate their transmission facilities with the new transmitter. There were also delays in the shipment of structural steel being used to erect the tower. in the West Hills.

Camellia also soon acknowledged that a Washington-specific focus would limit the station's audience and appeal, and changed the call sign to KPDX, representing Portland's airport code. Channel 49 finally signed on October 7, 1983. It maintained a main studio in Vancouver and a production facility in Portland. Initially, KPDX was a general entertainment independent station; the station's format consisted of cartoons, sitcoms, classic movies, drama series and religious programs.

Portland had been big enough since at least the 1960s to support a second independent station alongside long-established KPTV. However, the Portland market is a very large one geographically; it stretches across a large swath of Oregon as well as much of southwestern Washington. The established stations needed an extensive translator network to reach the entire market, an expense which stymied the first attempt at a second independent in the market, Salem-based KVDO-TV (now Bend Oregon Public Broadcasting outlet KOAB-TV). By the early 1980s, however, cable and satellite—which are all but essential for acceptable television in the rural portions of the market—had gained enough penetration for a second independent to be viable.

Although it was well behind KPTV, one of the strongest independent stations in the country, KPDX more than held its own in its early years and received decent ratings.

As a Fox affiliate

By 1988, KPTV was one of several Fox affiliates across the country that were disappointed with the young network's weak programming offerings. KPTV subsequently disaffiliated from the network that year and reverted to being an independent station. KPDX assumed the market's Fox affiliation on August 29, 1988. However, until 1993, the station was a de facto independent station because Fox would have only select days of primetime programming at that time (it would finally have programming on all seven days a week in 1993). The station relocated its studios to a new building located on NE Union Avenue (now Martin Luther King Jr. Boulevard) in Portland by 1989, by which point they had rebranded themselves as 'Fox 49'. Columbia River Television sold the station to Cannell Communications, a broadcast group owned by television producer and author Stephen J. Cannell in 1992. Cannell sold both KPDX and sister station WHNS in Greenville, South Carolina to First Media Television in 1994. The station began to add more talk and children's programs in the 1990s. KPDX and WHNS were acquired by Meredith Corporation in 1997. It gradually drew closer to KPTV as Fox came into its own as a network.

As a UPN affiliate

Meredith acquired KPTV, by then a UPN affiliate, in 2002 following a station swap with Fox Television Stations—which had acquired the station as part of Chris-Craft/United Television's sale of its stations to Fox—in exchange for WOFL in Orlando, Florida (and its semi-satellite WOGX in Ocala). The KPTV purchase resulted in the creation of the first television station duopoly in the Portland market with KPDX. Since KPTV was still well ahead of KPDX in the ratings, Meredith opted to move the Fox affiliation back to KPTV on September 2, 2002. KPDX took the UPN affiliation from KPTV. However, Fox's Saturday morning children's program lineup remained on KPDX, where it continued to air under the brand 4Kids TV until Fox discontinued children's programming on December 27, 2008. Meredith took advantage of the KPTV acquisition by moving the latter station from its older downtown studios and into the new modern facility built for KPDX in Beaverton.

As a MyNetworkTV affiliate
On January 24, 2006, the Warner Bros. unit of Time Warner and CBS Corporation announced that the two companies would shut down The WB and UPN and combine the networks' respective programming to create The CW, a new "fifth" network that would combine programming from both The WB and UPN. The market's WB station, KWBP (channel 32, now KRCW-TV), was named as The CW's Portland affiliate through a 16-station group agreement with KWBP's owner, the Tribune Company. One month later on February 22, 2006, News Corporation announced the launch of a new "sixth" network called MyNetworkTV, which would be operated by Fox Television Stations and its syndication division Twentieth Television. On March 9, 2006, it was announced that KPDX would become a charter affiliate of the new network.

KPDX dropped the UPN branding on April 1, 2006, rebranding from "UPN 49" to "PDX 49", and adopted a new logo in the process. This change of branding had been planned before UPN's shutdown was announced, but the timing of the change was convenient for the upcoming affiliation switch. KPDX's move mirrored one implemented at future MyNetworkTV station WDCA in Washington, D.C. (which branded as "DCA 20") in using the last three letters of its callsign as its station branding. KPDX retained this branding following MyNetworkTV's launch, and is one of the few MyNetworkTV affiliates to not adopt the network's "blue TV" logo and/or branding style at any point.

On September 8, 2008, KPDX moved MyNetworkTV programming from 8–10 p.m. to 9–11 p.m., making it one of five MyNetworkTV stations at the time that did not air the network's programming in its normal 8–10 p.m. timeslot (KEVU-LP in Eugene, KRON-TV in San Francisco, KQCA in Sacramento—which has since moved MyNetworkTV programming back to its normal 8–10 p.m. timeslot—and KMYQ (now KZJO) in Seattle were the others). Concurrent with the schedule change and in anticipation of the station's 25th anniversary, KPDX's on-air brand was modified from "PDX 49" to "PDX TV".

On September 8, 2015, Media General announced that it would acquire Meredith for $2.4 billion, with the combined group to be renamed Meredith Media General once the sale was finalized by June 2016. Because Media General already owned CBS affiliate KOIN (channel 6) and Meredith owns KPTV and KPDX, the companies would have been be required to sell either KPTV or KOIN to comply with FCC ownership rules that forbid common ownership of two of the four highest-rated television stations in a given market in total day viewership, as well as recent changes to FCC ownership rules that restrict sharing agreements; KPDX was the only one of the three stations affected by the merger that could legally be acquired by Meredith Media General, as its total day viewership ranks below the top-four ratings threshold. However, on January 27, 2016, Nexstar Broadcasting Group announced that it had reached an agreement to acquire Media General, resulting in the termination of Meredith's acquisition by Media General.

On February 12, 2018, KPDX branding was changed from PDX-TV to "Fox 12 Plus", as an extension of KPTV's "Fox 12 Oregon" branding.

Sale to Gray Television
On May 3, 2021, Gray Television announced its intent to purchase the Meredith Local Media division for $2.7 billion. The sale was completed on December 1. As a result, KPDX and KPTV became Gray's first stations on the West Coast of the contiguous United States.

Sports programming
Through a partnership with sister station KPTV, a select number of Portland Timbers matches air on KPDX.

Newscasts 
During the 1990s as a Fox affiliate, KPDX ran a half-hour 10 p.m. newscast that was produced by CBS affiliate KOIN through a news share agreement. In 2000, KPDX launched its own in-house news department and began producing a nightly 10 p.m. newscast. Upon KPTV's purchase by Meredith, KPDX's news operation was merged with KPTV's news department (although KPTV's operations were actually moved into KPDX's newer facility, located in Beaverton), and KPDX's existing 10 p.m. newscast was canceled.
 
On September 8, 2008, KPDX began airing a KPTV-produced 8 p.m. newscast; KPTV's production of the hour-long weeknight newscast makes that station one of only a few Fox stations in the United States that produces a newscast for another station in the same market. On April 19, 2010, KPTV began producing a fifth hour of its weekday morning newscast Good Day Oregon for KPDX (running from 9 to 10 a.m.) called More Good Day Oregon, which featured various entertainment and lifestyles topics from a seasoned panel of experts; the program was cancelled in 2012 and was replaced by syndicated programming. On September 29, 2014, KPDX expanded its evening news programming with the launch of an hour-long 9:00 p.m. newscast, resulting in KPTV producing three hours of news in primetime (two hours on channel 49, as well as the flagship hour-long 10:00 p.m. broadcast on channel 12); as a result, the station delayed MyNetworkTV programming later in the evening. The 9 p.m. newscast actually premiered on August 25, 2014, nearly a month earlier than originally announced.

Technical information

Subchannels
The station's digital signal is multiplexed:

ATSC 3.0

Analog-to-digital conversion
KPDX-TV shut down its analog signal, over UHF channel 49, at 9:30 a.m. on June 12, 2009, the official date in which full-power television stations in the United States transitioned from analog to digital broadcasts under federal mandate. A half-hour earlier at 9:00 a.m., the station moved its digital signal from its pre-transition UHF channel 48 to channel 30 (UHF channel 30 was previously used by sister station KPTV for its digital signal; that station vacated that allocation concurrently with KPDX's transition), using PSIP to display the station's virtual channel as its former UHF analog channel 49.

Translators

KPDX was previously broadcast on some of its own translators and later, in some cases, on digital translators that carried the main channels of KPTV and KPDX.

With the ATSC 3.0 transition, the KPDX subchannels moved to the KPTV and KGW multiplexes and were added to their dependent translator stations.

References

External links

MyNetworkTV affiliates
Ion Mystery affiliates
Circle (TV network) affiliates
Court TV affiliates
Television channels and stations established in 1983
PDX
Gray Television
1983 establishments in Washington (state)
ATSC 3.0 television stations
Former Meredith Corporation subsidiaries